Four ships of the Royal Navy have borne the name HMS Gallant:

  was a gunvessel launched in 1797, and known for at least some of her career as Gunboat No. 29.  She was sold in 1802.
  was a 12-gun gun-brig launched in 1804 and sold in 1815.
  was a G-class destroyer launched in 1935. She was damaged by a mine in 1941 and an air raid in 1942, being declared a total loss. She was sunk as a blockship in 1943 and the wreck dispersed in 1953.
 HMS Gallant was to have been a  destroyer. She was ordered in 1944 as HMS Gael, but was cancelled the following year.

Royal Navy ship names